RAWP may mean:
 a remedial action workplan in Environmental engineering law
 The Resource Allocation Working Party, established in the British NHS